Rahim Khan (also Romanized as Raḩīm Khān) is a village in Akhtachi-ye Mahali Rural District of Simmineh District of Bukan County, West Azerbaijan province, Iran. At the 2006 National Census, its population was 1,738 in 311 households. The following census in 2011 counted 1,804 people in 415 households. The latest census in 2016 showed a population of 1,820 people in 551 households; it was the largest village in its rural district.

References 

Bukan County

Populated places in West Azerbaijan Province

Populated places in Bukan County